Mauricio Alexander Ortega Girón (born 4 August 1994 in Apartadó, Antioquia) is a Colombian discus thrower. His personal best of 70.29 for the event is the Colombian record. He also holds the South American junior record.

He was the gold medallist at the 2014 South American Games and a bronze medallist at the 2013 South American Championships in Athletics. He was a two-time champion at the South American Junior Championships in Athletics.

Career
He competed at the 2011 World Youth Championships in Athletics and placed fourth. He topped the podium at the 2011 South American Junior Championships in Athletics with a national junior record mark of 
 – he was the youngest entrant at the event. He began to throw with the senior-weight discus that year and was the winner of the 2012 South American Under-23 Championships in Athletics.

Ortega established himself at the senior level in 2013. A Colombian senior record came at the 2013 Bolivarian Games, where his throw of  brought him the gold medal in a games record.

Personal bests

Achievements

References

External links

Living people
1994 births
Colombian male discus throwers
Sportspeople from Antioquia Department
Athletes (track and field) at the 2015 Pan American Games
Athletes (track and field) at the 2019 Pan American Games
World Athletics Championships athletes for Colombia
Pan American Games competitors for Colombia
Athletes (track and field) at the 2016 Summer Olympics
Olympic athletes of Colombia
South American Games gold medalists for Colombia
South American Games medalists in athletics
Central American and Caribbean Games gold medalists for Colombia
Competitors at the 2014 South American Games
Athletes (track and field) at the 2018 South American Games
Competitors at the 2014 Central American and Caribbean Games
Competitors at the 2018 Central American and Caribbean Games
South American Championships in Athletics winners
Central American and Caribbean Games medalists in athletics
Ibero-American Championships in Athletics winners
South American Games gold medalists in athletics
Athletes (track and field) at the 2020 Summer Olympics
21st-century Colombian people